The Left Alliance (vas.) is a left-wing political party in Finland.

The Left Alliance was founded in 1990 as the chief successor of the left-wing Finnish People's Democratic League (SKDL). Although not as electorally successful as the SKDL, it has achieved some success, typically receiving around eight to ten percent of the vote in parliamentary elections. It has participated in five cabinets, most recently the Marin Cabinet formed in 2019. It is socialist, and democratic socialist, and it supports the principles of eco-socialism.

The Left Alliance is a member of the Nordic Green Left Alliance and an observer member of the Party of the European Left. The party newspaper is the montly Kansan Uutiset. It provides the Government of the Sanna Marin with two ministers, Li Andersson as the Education Minister and Hanna Sarkkinen as the Minister of Social Affairs and Health.

History
The party was founded by the Finnish People's Democratic League (SKDL), the majority of members of the waning Communist Party of Finland (SKP) and the Finnish Women's Democratic League (SNDL). It was later joined by the communist Democratic Alternative. The founding meeting was held in April 1990 in Helsinki, following the publishing of the April Declaration, which stated the party's ideals.

The party's history has been characterised by internal disputes and bickering, as it was formed via people with very different views on society. There have been several defections from the Left Alliance to the Social Democratic Party (SDP) and the newly formed Communist Party of Finland. In 2005, the party's former secretary and Central Organisation of Finnish Trade Unions's assistant head Matti Viialainen formed a group to promote a merger between the two largest Finnish left-wing political parties, the Left Alliance and the SDP. This caused an outrage within the Left Alliance, and Viialainen was condemned for wanting to break up the party. Viialainen subsequently left the party and ran for parliament on the SDP ticket in 2007.

In 2006, the party's leader Suvi-Anne Siimes announced her resignation from the post and the party as a result of long-standing feuds with the leftist section of the party. On 13 May 2006 Martti Korhonen was elected as the new party leader. He was followed by Paavo Arhinmäki in June 2009, following the party's bad performance in the 2009 EU parliamentary election, in which the party lost its only seat.

In the 2011 election, the party won 14 seats and became a partner in the six-party grand coalition cabinet led by Jyrki Katainen. The decision to join the government created a split in the party, leading to the expulsion of two MPs from the parliamentary group. In 2014 the Left Alliance left the cabinet over a dispute on a package of spending cuts and tax hikes. In 2014 European Parliament election, the party regained their seat.

In the 2015 parliamentary election, the party received 211,615 votes, 7.1% of the total, and won 12 seats in the parliament. In April 2016, Arhinmäki announced that he wouldn't seek another term as the party leader. On 11 June 2016, Arhinmäki was succeeded by Li Andersson. Under the leadership of Andersson, the party gained support in the 2017 municipal elections and the 2019 parliamentary election; in the latter, the party increased its representation in the parliament for the first time since 1995.

Ideology and policies 

According to the Left Alliance's party programme, adopted by the 5th Party Congress 16 June 2007, the fundamental values of the Left Alliance are equality, freedom, sustainable development, and democracy. The party believes democracy must be strengthened, stronger than the power of capital and challenge global capitalism. Important values also include global solidarity, stopping political polarisation in Finland, freedom and the right to work and income for all people, and environmental consciousness. The party is for equality in all its forms and identifies strongly as feminist and anti-racist as well as supporting economic equality. The party supports introducing a universal basic income and prioritizes supporting the weakest members of society.

The Left Alliance wants to improve the European Union to be more socially just. The party endorses a European Green New Deal via changing the European Central Bank's finance-sector quantitative easing stimulus into green stimulus investments to mitigate global warming and to provide green collar jobs. 

The Party has traditionally been one of the staunch opposers of a NATO membership. After Finland considered an accession bid to the NATO in May 2022, the party was in doubt whether to officially support an eventual NATO membership but assured it would stay in the Finnish Government in the case it would make one. During its annual party congress in June 2022, the alliance adapted its party program and now only demands an eventual NATO membership to remain defensive, with no permanent NATO military bases in the country. It also demanded the Kurdistan Workers' Party (PKK) to be taken off the terror list from the European Union.

Chairs 
Claes Andersson (1990–1998)
Suvi-Anne Siimes (1998–2006)
Martti Korhonen (2006–2009)
Paavo Arhinmäki (2009–2016)
Li Andersson (2016–present)

Election results

Parliamentary elections

Municipal elections

European Parliament

Presidential elections

Current members of parliament
The following politicians were elected to the Finnish Parliament in the April 2019 parliamentary election.

 Li Andersson
 Paavo Arhinmäki (replaced by Suldaan Said Ahmed on 9 September 2021)
 Katja Hänninen
 Anna Kontula
 Johannes Yrttiaho
 Mai Kivelä
 Markus Mustajärvi
 Jari Myllykoski
 Aino-Kaisa Pekonen
 Hanna Sarkkinen
 Matti Semi
 Veronika Honkasalo
 Juho Kautto
 Pia Lohikoski
 Jussi Saramo
 Merja Kyllönen

References

External links

 
Political parties supporting universal basic income